CrunchBang Linux (abbreviated #!) was a Linux distribution derived from Debian by Philip Newborough (who is more commonly known by his username, corenominal).

CrunchBang was designed to use comparatively few system resources. Instead of a desktop environment it used a customized implementation of the Openbox window manager. Many of its preinstalled applications used the GTK+ widget toolkit.

CrunchBang had its own software repository but drew the vast majority of packages from Debian's repositories.

Philip Newborough announced on 6 February 2015 that he had stopped developing CrunchBang and that users would benefit from using vanilla Debian. Some Linux distributions have arisen in its place in an effort to continue its environment. Among the most significant are BunsenLabs and CrunchBang++.

Editions 
CrunchBang Linux provided an Openbox version for i686, i486 and amd64 architectures. Until October 2010 there also was a "Lite" version  with fewer installed applications. The "Lite" version was effectively discontinued after the distribution on which it was based – Ubuntu 9.04 – reached its end-of-life and CrunchBang prepared to switch to a different base system.

CrunchBang 10, made available in February 2011, was the first version based on Debian. The final version, CrunchBang 11, was made available on 6 May 2013.

Each CrunchBang Linux release was given a version number as well as a code name, using names of Muppet Show characters. The first letter of the code name was the first letter of the upstream Debian release (previously Debian Squeeze and CrunchBang Statler and currently Debian Wheezy and CrunchBang Waldorf).

Reception
In May 2013 Jim Lynch of desktoplinuxreviews.com reviewed CrunchBang 11:

Successors 
Newborough announced in February 2015 that he was abandoning further development of CrunchBang Linux, feeling that it no longer served a purpose. Many users disagreed, and a number of them proceeded to develop successor distributions BunsenLabs, CrunchBang++ (#!++) and CrunchBang-Monara.

BunsenLabs 

BunsenLabs Linux is a community-organized successor to Crunchbang. It is based on the Debian 10 (Buster) stable release. Between 17 and 30 September 2015, CrunchBang's domain began redirecting to BunsenLabs.

BunsenLabs is one of the few modern Debian-based live distributions that still offers a CD edition supporting 32-bit systems, with both the X Window System and a modern version of Firefox, making the distro useful for running on old computers with just around 1 GB of RAM.

The latest version, based on Debian 11, was released on 19 December 2022.

CrunchBang++ 
CrunchBang PlusPlus (#!++) was developed in response to Newborough's announcement of the end of CrunchBang. It is currently based on the Debian Bullseye (release 11.1) distribution. Release 1.0 was announced on 29 April 2015. A version based on Debian 10.0 was released on 8 July 2019. The version based on Debian 11.0 was released on 16 August 2021, and the version based on Debian 11.1 was released on 23 September 2021.

CrunchBang-Monara 
CrunchBang-Monara is another successor to CrunchBang. It is based on the Debian 8 stable release.

References

External links
 https://www.crunchbangplusplus.org/ Official Crunchbang++ website
 Official website archives, on Archive.org
 
 CrunchBang Archive

Debian-based distributions
Discontinued Linux distributions
Linux distributions